Damir Redzic (born 23 March 2003) is a Hungarian professional footballer who plays as a forward for Ferencvárosi TC in the Nemzeti Bajnokság I.

Career
Redzic was born in Pécs, Hungary, to a Bosnian father and a Hungarian mother.

On 23 January 2021, he played his first match in the Ferencváros first team against Puskás Akadémia FC on the 17th match day of the 2020–21 Nemzeti Bajnokság I season.

Career statistics
.

References

External links

2003 births
Living people
Sportspeople from Pécs
Hungarian people of Bosnia and Herzegovina descent
Hungarian footballers
Association football forwards
Hungary youth international footballers
Nemzeti Bajnokság I players
Nemzeti Bajnokság II players
Ferencvárosi TC footballers
Soroksár SC players
21st-century Hungarian people